Daniel, Dan or Danny Rose may refer to:

 Daniel Rose (politician) (1772–1833), American politician
 Danny Rose (footballer, born 1988), English professional footballer for Grimsby Town
 Danny Rose (footballer, born 1990), English professional footballer for Watford
 Danny Rose (footballer, born 1993), English professional footballer for Northampton Town
 Dan Rose (footballer, born 2003), English professional footballer for Schalke 04
 Daniel Rose (chef), American-born Paris-based chef
 Daniel Rose (real estate developer), American real estate developer and philanthropist
 Daniel Asa Rose, American author, journalist, and editor
 Broadway Danny Rose, 1984 film directed by Woody Allen